Araeoderes is a genus of fungus weevils in the beetle family Anthribidae. There is one described species in Araeoderes, A. texanus.

References

Further reading

 
 

Anthribidae
Articles created by Qbugbot